Werner Wägelin (7 August 1913 – 28 February 1991) was a Swiss cyclist. He competed in the sprint and the team pursuit events at the 1936 Summer Olympics.

References

External links
 

1913 births
1991 deaths
Swiss male cyclists
Olympic cyclists of Switzerland
Cyclists at the 1936 Summer Olympics
Cyclists from Zürich